The second series of Love Island began on 30 May 2016 hosted by Caroline Flack on ITV2, and ended on 11 July 2016. It's the second from the revived series, but fourth overall. The series was narrated by Iain Stirling. The series was extended to air every night of the week, as opposed to the previous series where it only aired six nights. However the Saturday episode was used as a weekly catch-up entitled Love Island: The Weekly Hot List rather than a nightly highlights episode. The average viewers for this series was 1,470,000, up 900,000 on the first series.

The series included the first time an Islander was removed from the villa, as Malia Arkian was removed just hours after she entered the villa following an altercation with Kady McDermott. It also featured a number of voluntarily exits from the series, as Rykard Jenkins decided to leave the villa after his new love interest Rachel Fenton was eliminated. Zara Holland also decided to leave after discovering her mum is in the hospital. Sophie Gradon also decided to voluntarily leave the villa. Sophie and Katie Salmon were also the first same-sex couple to feature in Love Island.

On 11 July 2016 the series was won by Cara De La Hoyde and Nathan Massey, with Alex Bowen and Olivia Buckland as runners-up.

Winners Cara and Nathan later went onto appear on The Only Way Is Essex, whilst Rykard joined the cast of Ibiza Weekender in 2017

Production
On Valentine's Day, 14 February 2016, it was confirmed that Love Island would return for a second series due to air later in the year. On 18 May 2016 it was confirmed that the series would begin on 30 May 2016, but had scrapped the live eliminations. A one-minute trailer for the series aired on 23 May 2016. Pictures of the villa were unveiled on 28 May 2016. The villa is located in Mallorca with 69 cameras watching the Islanders' every move. It only includes double beds forcing them to share with each other, but has a special Hideaway bedroom for couples to spend the night away from the others.

Islanders
The Islanders for the second series were revealed on 24 May 2016, just a week before the launch. However, throughout the series, more Islanders entered the villa to find love. Some Islanders were dumped from the island for either failing to couple up, some were voted off by their fellow Islanders, and others for receiving the fewest votes in public eliminations. The series was won by Cara and Nathan on 11 July 2016 having received 54% of the vote.

Coupling
The couples were chosen shortly after the contestants entered the villa. After all of the girls entered, the boys were asked to choose a girl to pair up with. Sophie was paired with Tom, Cara with Nathan, Malin and Rykard paired up, Zara and Scott coupled up, whilst Olivia paired up with Daniel and Javi remained single. However, throughout the series the couples swapped and changed.

Notes

 : As new arrivals, Kady and Terry could not couple up with each other.
 : On Day 21, new Islanders Liana and Tina were asked to put two couples on a break and separate them for the night. They chose Alex and Olivia, and Kady and Scott. As a result, Scott became coupled up with Tina for the night, and Liana was coupled with Alex.
 : On Day 37, due to Sophie and Katie coupling up, this left two single boys Adam J and Troy. Lauren then entered the villa to choose which one to couple up with and which to dump from the island.
 : As Adam J and Lauren were already immune, they were automatically coupled up.

Weekly summary
The main events in the Love Island villa are summarised in the table below.

Ratings
Official ratings are taken from BARB and include ITV2 +1. Because the Saturday episodes are weekly catch-up episodes rather than nightly highlights, these are not included in the overall averages.

Couples still together 

 Nathan Massey and Cara De La Hoyde
 Alex Bowen and Olivia Buckland

References

2016 British television seasons
Love Island (2015 TV series)